Uratta is a village in southeastern Nigeria.  Also, it is located near the city of Owerri.

Today it falls under owerri north local government jurisdiction.  Uratta is further subdivided into seven clans or autonomous communities.

Villages in Igboland
Towns in Imo State